Triermain Castle was a castle near Brampton, Cumbria, England.
Triermain, Cumbria (Trewermain, Treverman c 1200): 'homestead at the stone' (Welsh tre(f) y maen)

It is featured in Samuel Taylor Coleridge's famous poem "Christabel" where the changeling, Geraldine, is apparently the daughter of Sir Roland de Vaux of Triermain.

History
Trierman was granted to Hubert I de Vaux by King Henry II of England in 1157. A manor existed on the site and in 1340, Roland de Vaux was given licence to crenellate his manor. the castle was constructed utilising stone robbed from Hadrian's Wall. The castle was ruinous by the mid 16th century.

References
Hugill, Robert. Castles and Peles of Cumberland and Westmorland. Frank Graham, Newcastle. 1977. pp. 179–180.

Castles in Cumbria
De Vaux family
City of Carlisle